Savina Dellicour is a Belgian film director and screenwriter. She made her feature-length debut in 2014 with All Cats Are Grey, which premiered at the 32nd Turin Film Festival. The film received nine nominations at the 6th Magritte Awards, including Best Film and Best Director for Dellicour. All Cats Are Grey also screened as a special presentation during the 2015 Santa Barbara International Film Festival, where it won Best International Film.

References

External links

Living people
Belgian film directors
Belgian screenwriters
Year of birth missing (living people)
Belgian women screenwriters